Lars Orvar Martin Lindwall (also Orwar; born 10 August 1941) is a Swedish épée fencer who won two team medals at the world championships in 1961–62. He competed at the 1960, 1964 and 1968 Summer Olympics and finished fifth with the Swedish team in 1960 and fourth in 1964. His best individual result was seventh place in 1964. Lindwall later attended the 1972–1984 and 1992 Olympics as a coach of the Swedish fencing team.

References

External links
 

1941 births
Living people
Swedish male épée fencers
Swedish male foil fencers
Olympic fencers of Sweden
Fencers at the 1960 Summer Olympics
Fencers at the 1964 Summer Olympics
Fencers at the 1968 Summer Olympics
Sportspeople from Lund
20th-century Swedish people